José Luis García Traid (6 April 1936 – 11 January 1990) was a Spanish retired footballer who played as a midfielder, and a former manager.

Playing career
Born in Zaragoza, Aragon, García Traid represented Club Patria Aragon and SD La Salle as a youth, before joining Real Zaragoza. Loan stints followed, with Tercera División sides Celta de Vigo and UD Amistad.

García Traid made his professional debut on 13 November 1955, starting and scoring a hat-trick in a 7–1 home routing of CP La Felguera in the Segunda División. He appeared in two further matches during the campaign, as his side achieved promotion to La Liga.

In January 1957, after making no appearances during the season, García Traid was loaned to Levante UD in the second level until June. He appeared in ten matches and scored two goals for the Valencians before his loan expired.

García Traid made his debut in the main category of Spanish football on 3 November 1957, in a 0–0 away draw against UD Las Palmas. He scored his first goal in the category on 7 December of the following year, but in a 1–7 loss at Atlético Madrid.

From 1958 to 1961, García Traid became a regular starter for the Maños, with his best input consisting of 28 matches and two goals in the 1959–60 campaign. He retired in 1963, aged only 26, due to a recurrent injury.

Managerial career
After retiring García Traid worked as a manager, his first club being AD San Lamberto's youth squads. In January 1971 he was named manager of his lifetime club Zaragoza, after a one-year spell at SD Huesca.

García Traid was sacked in April, after failing to maintain the club's first division status. In 1973, he was appointed UD Salamanca manager, achieving top level promotion at first attempt; he remained in charge of the latter until 1978.

After a spell at Real Betis in the second tier, García Traid was appointed at the helm of Burgos CF in 1979. After again suffering relegation, he was named Atlético Madrid manager.

García Traid was relieved from his duties at Atleti in August 1981, but returned to the club in November after the dismissal of Luis Cid; he remained in charge until the end of the season. In the following years he managed Real Valladolid, Salamanca (two spells), Celta de Vigo and Hércules CF.

Death
On 11 January 1990, García Traid died in Zaragoza due to a mechanical failure during a plastic surgery.

References

External links
 
 
 National team data at BDFutbol

1936 births
1990 deaths
Footballers from Zaragoza
Spanish footballers
Association football midfielders
La Liga players
Segunda División players
Tercera División players
RC Celta de Vigo players
Real Zaragoza players
Levante UD footballers
Spain B international footballers
Spanish football managers
La Liga managers
Segunda División managers
SD Huesca managers
Real Zaragoza managers
UD Salamanca managers
Real Betis managers
Burgos CF (1936) managers
Atlético Madrid managers
Real Valladolid managers
RC Celta de Vigo managers
Hércules CF managers